Tio Ie Soei (22 June 1890 – 20 August 1974; also known by the pen name Tjoa Pit Bak) was a peranakan Chinese writer and journalist active in the Dutch East Indies and Indonesia. Born in the capital at Batavia (now Jakarta), Tio entered journalism while still a teenager. By 1911 he had begun writing fiction, publishing Sie Po Giok – his first novel – that year. Over the next 50 years Tio wrote extensively in several newspapers and magazines, serving as an editor for some. He also wrote several novels and biographies, including ones on Tan Sie Tat and Lie Kim Hok.

Early life and career
Tio was born in Pasar Baru, Batavia, on 22 June 1890. His father was to a Chinese immigrant from Fujian province, while his mother was peranakan Chinese (mixed race). The young Tio was educated at a Dutch-run school for ethnic Chinese, learning Dutch and a smattering of various other languages.

He made his first venture into journalism in 1905, working for a short period for Sinar Betawi. Not long afterwards he quit and joined Perniagaan, which was mostly targeted at ethnic Chinese. He stayed with the publication for another fifteen years. Tio eventually rose to editor. During this period he married the daughter of one of his coworkers.

Productive period

Tio wrote his earliest fiction in the 1910s. His first novel – targeted at children – was published 1911. Entitled Sie Po Giok, it followed a young orphan who is treated unfairly by his uncle and eventually leaves for China. The story proved popular upon its release, and Tio followed with several further short stories. He also wrote several biographical anthologies in this period.

In 1920 Tio fell ill and resigned from Perniagaan. He and his family moved to Pengalengan, south of Bandung, so he could recuperate. There they opened a vegetable farm. Tio continued to write, sending his work to various publications, including Bintang Soerabaia, Warna Warta, and Kong Po. One of these writings, published in the Bandung-based Lay Po in 1923, revealed that Lie Kim Hok's Sair Tjerita Siti Akbari (1884) had based heavily on Raja Ali Haji's 1846 poem Sjair Abdoel Moeloek. This created a scandal, and Lie was accused of plagiarism. In 1924 he established a literary review, entitled Tjerita Pilihan (Choice Stories) which published translations of European literature; although initial circulation was remarkably high, at 5,000 copies, it had gone bankrupt by the tenth issue.

His time in West Java was one of his most productive, in terms of fiction writing. Under his own name and the pen name Tjoa Pit Bak, he published several novels and biographies with various publishers. Some were translations of European works, while others were ostensibly based on true events in the Indies. These were mostly crime stories, although others, such as his Pieter Elberveld (about Pieter Erberveld), were historical stories based on Dutch language originals.

When he had recovered his strength, Tio moved to Cirebon in 1925 and attempted to open a shop. This was unsuccessful, and he moved to Banjarmasin that year to establish his own newspaper. By 1926 he had returned to Java, working in Surabaya as the editor of Pewarta Soerabaja. He wrote a biography of the boxer Tan Sie Tat in 1928; it would prove to be Tio's last book for thirty years.

Later career
The editorship at Pewarta Soerabaja proved Tio's longest-held position; he headed the newspaper continuously until 1942, when the Japanese occupied the Indies. Tio evacuated from Surabaya and hid near Kediri. He only reentered the press in 1948, when he began writing for the magazine Liberal. In the later years of his career Tio was increasingly active with various press organisations. He headed the Surabayan Reporters Union, which later became part of the Indonesian Reporters Union.

Tio retired from journalism in 1957 and moved to Jakarta. He continued, however, to write. Tio published several articles as a freelance journalist. He also wrote a biography of Lie Kim Hok, published in 1958, commemorating the 105th anniversary of the latter's birth. This book, entitled Lie Kimhok (1853–1912), did not focus exclusively on Lie, but outlined various aspects of peranakan life during the late 19th century. Tio died in Jakarta on 20 August 1974.

Legacy
Sie Po Giok was republished, using the Perfected Spelling System, in 2000 as part of the first instalment in the Kesastraan Melayu Tionghoa series. Tio's biography of Lie Kim Hok was included in the fifth instalment of the series.

Bibliography

 (in five volumes)
 (in two volumes)

 (in two volumes, translated from the Dutch novel Zeerover)

 (about Pieter Erberveld)

 (as Tjoa Pit Bak)
 (as Tjoa Pit Bak)

 (as Tjoa Pit Bak)

References

Works cited

1890 births
1974 deaths
20th-century novelists
Indonesian journalists
Indonesian novelists
Indonesian people of Chinese descent
Indonesian Hokkien people
Indonesian writers
People from Batavia, Dutch East Indies
20th-century journalists